Stanley John Dragoti (October 4, 1932 – July 13, 2018) was an American film director whose work includes the comedies Mr. Mom and Love at First Bite.

Life
Dragoti was born in New York City to Albanian parents, both having emigrated in the 1920s from the district of Tepelenë, in Southern Albania. His interest in cinematography led him to Cooper Union College in New York and later to the Visual Arts College.  He has also produced ads for the air travel and automobile industry.

Dragoti died on July 13, 2018, in Los Angeles at the age of 85. He underwent open-heart surgery in 2014.

Filmography

References

External links

Stan Dragoti at The Numbers

Stan Dragoti at FilmReference.com

1931 births
2018 deaths
American film directors
American people of Albanian descent
Comedy film directors
Special Tony Award recipients
People from New York City